Ormsbee may refer to:

Caleb Ormsbee (1752–1807), American architect who designed at least two National Historic Landmark homes
Ebenezer J. Ormsbee (1834–1924), teacher, lawyer, U.S. politician of the Republican Party, American Civil War veteran
Francis E. Ormsbee, Jr. (1892–1936), American naval aviator in the U.S. Navy during World War I, received the Medal of Honor for bravery
James Ormsbee Chapin (1887–1975), American painter and illustrator

See also
Ormsby (disambiguation)